Frederick Desrosiers (14 June 1940 – 2 September 2004) was a Canadian boxer. He competed in the men's welterweight event at the 1964 Summer Olympics. At the 1964 Summer Olympics, he lost to Silvano Bertini of Italy.

References

1940 births
2004 deaths
Canadian male boxers
Olympic boxers of Canada
Boxers at the 1964 Summer Olympics
Place of birth missing
Welterweight boxers